The Indigo Trust is a UK-based grant-making foundation operating from London and is one of the organizations that makes up the Sainsbury Family Charitable Trusts. It funds technology-driven projects to bring about social change, largely in African countries. The Trust focuses mainly on innovation, transparency and citizen empowerment and provides funding of approximately £500,000 a year.

Indigo Trust is a supporter of innovation hubs like HiveColab, the IHub and others like HyperCube.

References

Development charities based in the United Kingdom